The 2002 United States Senate election in Rhode Island took place on November 5, 2002. Incumbent Democratic U.S. Senator Jack Reed won re-election to a second term with nearly 80% of the vote. Reed's best performance was in Providence County, where he won with over 80% of the vote.

Democratic primary

Candidates 
 Jack Reed, incumbent U.S. Senator

Results

Republican primary

Candidates 
 Robert Tingle, casino pit boss and nominee for RI-02 in 2000

Results

General election

Candidates 
 Jack Reed (D), incumbent U.S. Senator
 Robert Tingle (R), casino pit boss and nominee for RI-02 in 2000

Campaign 
Reed was an extremely popular senator who got token opposition in the general election. A May Brown University poll showed the incumbent with a 73% approval rating, higher than any other elected lawmaker in the state. In June 2002, Tingle announced his candidacy. Tingle described himself as a working man with a family, while Reed is single and a veteran politician. In an October poll, Reed was up 61% to 14%.

Predictions

Results

See also 
 2002 United States Senate election

References 

Rhode Island
2002
2002 Rhode Island elections